Uroptychodes is a genus of squat lobsters in the family Chirostylidae, containing the following species:
 Uroptychodes albatrossae (Baba, 1988)
 Uroptychodes barunae Baba, 2004
 Uroptychodes benedicti (Baba, 1977)
 Uroptychodes epigaster Baba, 2004
 Uroptychodes grandirostris (Yokoya, 1933)
 Uroptychodes mortenseni (Van Dam, 1939)
 Uroptychodes musorstomi Baba, 2004
 Uroptychodes nowra (Ahyong & Poore, 2004)
 Uroptychodes okutanii (Baba, 1981a)
 Uroptychodes spinimarginatus (Henderson, 1885)
 Uroptychodes spinulifer (Van Dam, 1940)
 Uroptychodes yapensis sp. nov.

References

Squat lobsters